The following list is a discography of production by J. Cole, an American rapper and record producer. It includes a list of songs produced, co-produced and remixed by year, artist, album and title.

Singles produced

2007

J. Cole - The Come Up 
01. "Intro”
02. "Simba" 
06. "Throw It Up" 
07 "College Boy"
 Sample Credit: Lil' Kim -"(Came Back for You)"
09. "Split You Up"
10. "Plain"
14. "Lil' Ghetto Nigga"
16. "Carolina On My Mind" (featuring Deacon)
17. "Can't Cry"   	
 Sample Credit: Millie Jackson - "(If Loving You Is Wrong) I Don't Want to Be Right"
18. "Goin' Off"
 Sample Credit: The Controllers - "If Tomorrow Never Comes"  	
19. "Rags to Riches (At the Beep)"  
 Sample Credit: Roy Ayers - "Everybody Loves the Sunshine"
20. "Get It"
21. "I Do My Thing" (performed by Nervous Reck)

2009

J. Cole - The Warm Up 
01. "Intro" 
02. "Welcome" 
04. "Grown Simba"
06. "Lights Please" 
 Sample Credit: Dexter Wansel - "Theme From the Planets"
08. "I Get Up" 
09. "World Is Empty"  
 Sample Credit: The Supremes - "My World Is Empty Without You"
10. "Dreams" (featuring Brandon Hines)
 Sample Credit: Hank Crawford - "Wildflower" 
12. "Dollar and a Dream II"  
13. "Water Break" (Interlude)
15. "Get Away"    
 Sample Credit: Billy Stewart - "Cross My Heart"
17. "Ladies" (featuring Lee Fields & The Expressions)    
 Sample Credit: Lee Fields & The Expressions - "Ladies" 
19. "The Badness" (featuring Omen)  
20. "Hold It Down"      
22. "Losing My Balance" (Bonus Track)
 Sample Credit: Sara Tavares - "Balance"

Leftover
00. "Song for the Ville"
00. "I Got It"
00. "Serenade"
00. "I'm Comin"
00. "Show Me Somethin"

2010

Rain - The Re-Up Mixtape 
03. "Come Home to Me"

J. Cole - Friday Night Lights 
01. "Intro" 
02. "Too Deep for the Intro" 
 Sample Credit: Erykah Badu - "Didn't Cha Know?"
03. "Before I'm Gone"
05. "You Got It" (featuring Wale)
 Sample Credit: Janelle Monáe - "Neon Valley Street"
07. "Enchanted" (co-produced with Omen) (featuring Omen)
08. "Blow Up"
 Sample Credit: Focus - "Hocus Pocus" 
09. "Higher"
12. "The Autograph"  
 Sample Credit: The Class-Set - "Julie" 
14. "Cost Me a Lot"  
 Sample Credit: Billie Holiday - "My Man" 
15. "Premeditated Murder"
16. "Home for the Holidays"    
17. "Love Me Not"    
 Sample Credit: Stevie Wonder - "My Cherie Amour" 
18. "See World" (co-produced with Elite)
 Sample Credit: Earl Klugh - "Living Inside Your Love" 
19. "Farewell"
 Sample Credit: OutKast - "So Fresh, So Clean"
Leftover
00. "Unabomber"
00. "Good Game"
00. "On Top of the World" (featuring A.L.)
00. "Purple Rain"
00. "It Won't Be Long"

Young Chris - The Network 2 
09. "Still the Hottest" (featuring J. Cole)

DJ Whoo Kid - XXL 10 Freshman for ’10″ 
07. "Who's World is This" (performed by J. Cole)

Voli - Glass Doors 
02. "Sunrise" (featuring Elite) (co-produced with Voli)

Diddy –Dirty Money - Last Train to Paris
Songwriting 
12. "Coming Home" (featuring Skylar Grey)

Bun B - Trill OG 
Leftover
00. "Bun B for President"

DJ Khaled - Victory 
Leftover
00. "We On" (featuring J. Cole)

2011

Fashawn - Higher Learning Vol. 2 
04. "Relaxation" (featuring J. Cole and Omen)
08. "Nothing for the Radio" (featuring J. Cole)
18. "Big Dreams"

XV - Zero Heroes 
04. "Smallville"
 Sample Credit: Smashing Pumpkins - "To Forgive"
Leftover
00. "Watch Me Go"

Kendrick Lamar - Section.80 
16. "HiiiPoWeR"

Fat Trel - April Foolz 
19. "Live My Life"

Alex Haldi - The Glorification of Gangster 
05. "Killers" (performed by J. Cole)

Voli - In the Meanwhile 
18. "Midnight" (Bonus Track)

J. Cole - Cole World: The Sideline Story 
01. "Intro"
02. "Dollar and a Dream III" (co-produced with Capsvl of The University)	
 Sample Credit: Yoko Shimomura - "Darkness of the Unknown"
04. "Lights Please"
 Sample Credit: Dexter Wansel - "Theme From the Planets"  
05. "Interlude"   	
06. "Sideline Story"   
07. "Mr. Nice Watch" (featuring Jay-Z) 	
08. "Cole World"
10. "Lost Ones"   
11. "Nobody's Perfect" (featuring Missy Elliott)
 Sample Credit: Curtis Mayfield - "Think"
13. "Rise and Shine"
 Sample Credit: Greg Dykes and The Synanon Choir - "Arise, Shine"  
14. "God's Gift"
 Sample Credit: Milton Nascimento - "Francisco"  
15. "Breakdown"
 Sample Credit: Eero Koivistoinen - "Bells"  
16. "Work Out"
 Sample Credit: Paula Abdul - "Straight Up"
17. "Who Dat" (Bonus Track) (co-produced with Elite)	
 Sample Credit: New Hope - "Godofallofus"
18. "Daddy's Little Girl" (Bonus Track)

Wale - Ambition 
Leftover
00. "Bad Girls Club" (featuring J. Cole)

Elite - Awaken 
11. "Cycles"

Bali 
 00. So Cold

2012

360 - Everywhere and Back 
09. "What Goes Up"

King Mez - My Everlasting Zeal 
06. "The Allure" (featuring Drey Skonie)

Trae, A.B.N. and Renegadez - Welcome 2 the Streets 
12. "Roll Call" (featuring J. Cole)

DJ Khaled - Kiss the Ring 
05. "They Ready" (featuring J. Cole, Big K.R.I.T. and Kendrick Lamar)
Sample Credit: Willie Hutch - "That's What I Call Loving You"

Sha Stimuli - The 9.2.5 EP 
01. "Two Weeks Notice"

Kendrick Lamar - good kid, m.A.A.d city 
Leftover
00. "The Jig Is Up (Dump'n)" (co-produced with Canei Finch)

Fabolous - The S.O.U.L. Tape 2 
07. "Louis Vuitton" (featuring J. Cole)

Bali - The Hardway 
13. "I Dont See Em"

2013

J. Cole - Truly Yours 
02. "Crunch Time" 
03. "Rise Above"
04. "Tears for ODB"

Funkmaster Flex - Who You Mad At? Me or Yourself? 
10. "Maine on Fire" (performed by J. Cole)

J. Cole - Truly Yours 2 
01. "Cole Summer" 
03. "Chris Tucker" (feat. 2 Chainz)  (co-produced by Canei Finch) 
04. "Head Bussa" 
05. "Cousins" (feat. Bas)  (produced with Ron Gilmore)

Talib Kweli - Prisoner of Conscious 
15. "It Only Gets Better" (featuring Marsha Ambrosious)

Bas - Quarter Water Raised Me Vol. II 
08. "Cousins" (featuring J. Cole)
Leftover
00. "The Season"

J. Cole - Born Sinner 
01. "Villuminati"
Sample Credit: "Juicy" by The Notorious B.I.G.
03. "LAnd of the Snakes"
Sample Credit: "Da Art of Storytellin' (Pt. 1)" by OutKast
04. "Power Trip" (featuring Miguel)
Sample Credit: "No More" by Hubert Laws
06. "Trouble"
07. "Runaway"
08. "She Knows" (featuring Amber Coffman)
09. "Rich Niggaz"
11. "Forbidden Fruit" (featuring Kendrick Lamar)
Sample Credit:  "Mystic Brew" by Ronnie Foster
12. "Chaining Day"
14. "Crooked Smile" (featuring TLC) (produced with Elite)
15. "Let Nas Down" 
16. "Born Sinner" (featuring James Fauntleroy) (produced with Elite)
17. "Miss America" (Bonus Track)
Sample Credit: Rue Royale - "Flightline"
18. "New York Times" (featuring 50 Cent and Bas) (Bonus Track)
19. "Is She Gon Pop" (Bonus Track)
20. "Niggaz Know" (Bonus Track)

DJ Khaled - Suffering from Success 
11. "Hell's Kitchen" (featuring Bas) (additional production by Canei Finch)

2014

Various artists - Revenge of the Dreamers 
01. "Lil' Niggaz" (snippet) 
05. "Revenge of the Dreamers" 
09. "Bitchez" 
10. "May the Bitter Man Win"

Ab-Soul - These Days... 
11. "Sapiosexual"

Elijah Blake - Drift EP 
03. "Vendetta"

J. Cole - 2014 Forest Hills Drive
01. "Intro"   (Additional production by Ron Gilmore) 
02. "January 28th"  (Additional production by Nick Paradise & Dre Charles for Team Titans) 
03. "Wet Dreamz"
06.  "Fire Squad"  (Additional production by Vinylz) 
07. "St Tropez"
08. "G.O.M.D." 
09. "No Role Modelz"  (produced by Phonix Beats, additional production by J. Cole)  
10. "Hello"  (co-produced with Pop Wansel and Jproof)
11. "Apparently" 
13  "Note to Self" (co-produced with Ron Gilmore)

2015

Voli - The Wall 
Leftover
00. "Sound of Love" (featuring J. Cole) (co-produced with Voli)

Trae tha Truth - Tha Truth 
08. "Children of Men"  (featuring J. Cole and Ink)

Omen - Elephant Eyes 
Leftover
00. "Undercover"

Janet Jackson - Unbreakable 
09. "No Sleeep" (featuring J. Cole) (Co-produced with Jimmy Jam & Terry Lewis and Janet Jackson)

A Tribe Called Quest - People's Instinctive Travels and the Paths of Rhythm (25th Anniversary Edition) 
17. "Can I Kick It? (J. Cole Remix)"

Dreamville - Revenge of the Dreamers II 
01. "Folgers Crystals" (performed by J. Cole) (Co-Produced by Elite)

Pusha T - King Push – Darkest Before Dawn: The Prelude 
05. "M.P.A." (featuring Kanye West, A$AP Rocky and The-Dream) (co-produced by Kanye West and Che Pope)

2016

Spillage Village - Bears Like This Too Much 
04. "Voodoo"  (performed by EarthGang) (co-produced by Childish Major) 
11. "Willow Tree"  (performed by J.I.D, JordxnBryant and EarthGang) (produced By Elite and Ron Gilmore, Additional Production by J. Cole)

J. Cole - 4 Your Eyez Only 
 01. 	For Whom the Bell Tolls
 02. 	Immortal 
 03. 	Deja Vu 	
 04. 	Ville Mentality
 05. 	She's Mine Pt. 1 	
 06. 	Change 	
 07. 	Neighbors 	
 08. 	Foldin Clothes	
 09. 	She's Mine Pt. 2 	
 10. 	4 Your Eyez Only
Production credit on all 10 songs on the album

Leftover
00. "Everybody Dies"

2017

JID - The Never Story 
05. "D/vision"  (feat. EarthGang) 
12. "LAUDER"

Logic - Everybody 
13. "AfricAryaN"  (feat. Neil Degrasse Tyson)

Childish Major - Woo$ah 
04. "Supply Luh"

Salomon Faye - King Salomon 
03. "Live and Learn"  (feat. J. Cole and Eryn Allen Kane)

2018

Cozz - Effected 
13. "Zendaya"  (feat. J. Cole)

Kill Edward 
00. "Tidal Wave" (Just a little reference)

J. Cole - KOD 
01. "Intro" 
02. "KOD" 
03. "Photograph" 
04. "The Cut Off"  (feat. Kill Edward) (co-produced by BLVK)  
05. "ATM" 
06  "Motiv8"
08. "BRACKETS"
09. "Once an Addict (Interlude)"  (Additional Production (Bassline) by Ron Gilmore)  
10. "Friends"  (feat. Kill Edward)   
11. "Window Pain (Outro)" 
12.  "1985 (Intro to The Fall Off)"

Mac Miller - Swimming 
02. "Hurt Feelings"  (Additional Production by Jon Brion and Dev Hynes)

Bas - Milky Way 
01. "Icarus"  (feat. Ari Lennox) (co-produced by Ron Gilmore and Meez) 
02. "Front Desk"  (co-produced by Jay Kurzweil and Ron Gilmore)  
03. "Tribe"   (feat. J. Cole) (co-produced by Childish Major) 
04. "Boca Raton"  (feat. ASAP Ferg) (produced by Sango, additional production by Cedric Brown and J. Cole) 
06. "Purge"  (co-produced by Ron Gilmore and Christo) 
07. "Fragrance"  (feat. Correy C) (produced by Cedric Brown, additional production by Meez, Ron Gilmore, TEC BEATZ and J. Cole) 
10. "Sanufa"  (Additional Production By Ron Gilmore) 
Leftover 
00. "Pinball II"  (feat. Correy C)  (produced with Cedric Brown, and ClickNPress)

Wale - Free Lunch EP 
 04. "My Boy (Freestyle)"  (feat. J. Cole)

Swizz Beatz - Poison 
Executive Producer of Album with Swizz Beatz

JID - DiCaprio 2 
09. "Skrawberries"  (feat. BJ The Chicago Kid) (arrangement by Mac Miller and horns by Masego)

2019

Dreamville - Revenge of the Dreamers III  
 16. "Middle Child"  (produced with T-Minus)

Ari Lennox - Shea Butter Baby 
 08. "Facetime"  (produced with Craig Brockman)

Cordae -  The Lost Boy  
06. "RNP"  (feat. Anderson Paak)

EarthGang -  Mirrorland 
01. "LaLa Challenge"  (produced by Lido and Olu, additional production by J. Cole)

Young Thug -  So Much Fun 
01. "Mannequin Challenge"  (feat. Juice WRLD) (produced by T-Minus and J. Cole)

2020

J. Cole - Lewis Street 
01. "The Climb Back" 
02. "Lion King on Ice"  (co-produced with JetsonMade and T-Minus)

2021

J. Cole - The Off-Season 
02. "Amari"  (co-produced by Timbaland, Sucuki and T-Minus)
03. "My Life"  (feat. 21 Savage and Morray) (co-produced by Jake One & Wu10)
Sample Credit: Styles P & Pharoahe Monch  - "The Life"
04. "Applying Pressure" 
06 "100 Mil" (feat. Bas) (co-produced by T-Minus)
08. "Let Go My Hand" (feat. Bas and 6LACK (co-produced by DJ Dahi & Wu10)
09. "Interlude" (co-produced by T-Minus and Tommy Parker)
10. "The Climb Back"  
11. "Close"

Cozz - Fortunate EP 
07. "Fortunate" (co-produced by Cedric Brown, Kurzweil & T-Minus)

2022

Dreamville - D-Day: A Gangsta Grillz Mixtape 

03. "Lifestyle" (performed by Bas feat. ASAP Ferg)
05. "Coming Down" (performed by Ari Lennox) (co-produced by DZL and Wu10)

Ari Lennox - Age/Sex/Location 

01. "POF" (co-produced by DZL and Wu10)

2023

Cordae - The Crossroads Tape 

 "Two Tens" (feat. Anderson Paak) (co-produced by Dem Jointz)

References

External links
 Official website
 
 
 

Discographies of American artists
Production discographies
Hip hop discographies
Production discography